Shahi Dam was built  about 700 -1000  years ago and  located in Kariz, Kuhsorkh County.

Sources

Dams in Iran
Kuhsorkh County
Buildings and structures in Rivash, Iran